The Farmers and Drovers Bank is a historic bank building at 201 W. Main Street in Council Grove, Kansas. The bank was built in 1892 by local contractors and opened to customers in early 1893. Its Victorian design followed a pattern known as the commercial palace, in which bold and eclectic features were used to symbolize wealth. The design includes a red brick exterior marked by limestone arched windows, a turret above the front corner, and a limestone cornice divided by pinnacles. The neighboring Indicator Building was built in 1902 as an addition to the bank building with matching architecture. The bank leased the space to local businesses, and the building took its name from its original tenant, a general store called the Indicator; however, the store only lasted a year before closing due to a flood and fire.

The bank was added to the National Register of Historic Places on June 21, 1971; its nomination included the Indicator Building.

References

External links

		
National Register of Historic Places in Morris County, Kansas
Bank buildings on the National Register of Historic Places in Kansas
Victorian architecture in Kansas
Commercial buildings completed in 1892